Rodeo Viejo is a corregimiento in Soná District, Veraguas Province, Panama with a population of 2,046 as of 2010. Its population as of 1990 was 2,558; its population as of 2000 was 2,212.

References

Corregimientos of Veraguas Province